Begusarai is the industrial and financial capital of Bihar and the administrative headquarters of the Begusarai district, which is one of the thirty-eight districts of the Indian state of Bihar. The district lies on the northern bank of the river Ganges in the Holy Mithila region of India.

Begusarai was named after "Begu" a man who was the devotee of Bari Durga Maharani was the care taker of "Sarai" an old and small market of the town.

Geography

Topography
It has an average elevation of 41 metres (134 feet). Begusarai lies in North Bihar and is surrounded by Khagaria in the north-east, Munger in the south-east, Patna in the west and Samastipur in the north-west.

Begusarai lies in the middle of the mid-Ganga plain and generally has low-lying terrain with a south to south-easterly slope. Begusarai is basically divided into three floodplains:
Ganga floodplain 
Burhi Gandak floodplain
Kareha-Bagmati floodplain.

Flora and fauna

Demographics
As per the 2011 census, Begusarai Municipal Corporation had a total population of 251,136, of whom 133,931 were male and 117,205 were female with a sex ratio of 875. The population younger than 5 years of age was 37,966. The literacy rate of the 7+ population was 79.35%.

Religion

Hinduism is the major religion in Begusarai city, with 224,282 followers (89%). Islam is second, with 26,531 Muslims (10.53%). Other religions include 325 Christians (0.13%), 134 Sikhs (0.05%), 31 Jains (0.01%), 29 Buddhists (0.01%), 14 other religions (0.01%) and 662 (0.26%) non-respondents

Politics
Begusarai has traditionally been a communist stronghold and was once referred to as the "Leningrad of Bihar". It is the karmabhoomi of the independence movement veteran, first chief minister and architect of modern Bihar, Dr. Shri Krishna Sinha.

Economy 
Agriculture is the mainstay of the economy. The main cash crops of the Begusarai district are oilseeds, anis seed/ tisi, tobacco, jute, potato, red Chile, tomato and rape-seed. In fruit farming, Begusarai has recently become a major contributor in producing litchi, mango, guava and banana. Recently basil leaves and pearl farming have attracted local farmers.
 
Even today, only the Barauni refinery contributes around Rs 500 crore to the state exchequer yearly. Begusarai also has an inactive airport in Begusarai Ulao. Begusarai had the second highest per capita income in financial year 2019–20 in Bihar, after Patna.

Culture
The culture of Begusarai is the cultural heritage of Mithila. Begusarai is also famous for Simaria, a fair of devotional significance every year in the month of Kartik according to the Indian Panchang, (usually during November). Men and women in Begusarai are very religious and dress for the festivals as well. The costumes of Begusarai stem from the rich traditional culture of Mithila. Panjabi Kurta and Dhoti with a Mithila Painting bordered  Maroon coloured Gamchha which is the Symbol of Passion, Love, Bravery and Courage are common clothing items for men. Men wear gold ring in their nose which symbolizes prosperity, happiness and wealth inspired by Lord Vishnu.  Also wear Balla on their wrist. In ancient times there was no colour option in Mithila, so the Maithil women wore white or yellow Saree with red Border but now they have a lot of variety and colour options, and wear Laal-Paara (the traditional red-boarded white or yellow sari) on some special occasions, and also wear Shakha-Pola  with lahthi in their hand. In Mithila culture, this represents new beginnings, passion and prosperity. Red also represents the Hindu goddess Durga, a symbol of new beginnings and feminine power. During Chhaith, the women of Begusarai wear pure cotton dhoti without stitching which reflects the pure, traditional Culture of Mithila. Usually crafted from pure cotton for daily use and from pure silk for more glamorous occasions, traditional attire for the women of Begusarai includes Jamdani, Banorisi and Bhagalpuri and many more.
Many festivals are celebrated throughout the year in Begusarai. Chhaith and Durga Puja is celebrated as perhaps the most important of all the celebrations of Begusarai.

Dance
Dhuno-Naach is the Cultural Dance of Begusarai, Mithila. Dhuno-Naach is performed in Begusarai, Khagaria, Katihar, Naugachia during Durga Puja and Kalipuja with Shankha-Dhaak Sound and Jhijhiya is performed in Darbhanga, Muzaffarpur, Madhubani and their Neighbour Districts.

Painting
Mithila Painting as a form of wall art is practiced widely in Begusarai; the more recent development of painting on paper and canvas originated among the villages in Begusarai, Darbhanga, Naugachia, Madhubani and it is these latter developments that may correctly be referred to as Begusarai Art, Madhubani art,  Darbhanga Art, Naugachia Art.

Main Festival
Here is a list of the main festivals of Begusarai:

 Chhaith: Prayers during Chhath puja are dedicated to the solar deity, Surya, to show gratitude and thankfulness
 Saama-Chakeba: includes folk theater and song, celebrates the love between brothers and sisters and is based on a legend recounted in the Puranas.
 Aghaniya Chhaith (Chhotka Pabni): Very popular with the name of "Chhotka-Pabni" and Dopaharka Aragh in Mithila.Celebrated in Aghan Shukla-paksha Shasthi tithi.
 Baisakkha Chhaith (Chhotka Pabni): This is celebrated in month of Baishakh Shukla-paksha Shasthi tithi and It is also called Chhotka-Pabni(Dopaharka Aragh) in Mithila.
 Chaurchan: Along with Lord Ganesha, Lord Vishnu, Goddess Parvati and the moon god is worshipped. The story of Chorchan Puja is also heard on this day after that arghya is offered to the moon god (Chandra Deva).
 Jitiya: celebrated mainly in Indian states of Bihar, Jharkhand and Uttar Pradesh and Nepal; mothers fast (without water) for wellbeing of their children.
 Vivaha Panchami: Hindu festival celebrating the wedding of Rama and Sita. It is observed on the fifth day of the Shukla paksha or waxing phase of moon in the Agrahayana month (November – December) as per Maithili calendar and in the month of Margashirsha in the Hindu calendar. 
 Sita Navami
 Ganga Dussehra: Ganga Dussehra, also known as Gangavataran, is a Hindu festival celebrated by Maithils in Mokshdhaam Simaria Dhaam (The Welcome Gate of Mithila). avatarana (descent) of the Ganges. It is believed by Hindus that the holy river Ganges descended from heaven to earth on this day. 
 Kalpwas: Celebrated in Every Kartik Month in Simaria Dhaam, Begushorai.
 Kojagiri (Lachhmi Puja): harvest festival marking the end of monsoon season 
 Paata Puja (Durga Maay Aagmon)
 Khutti Puja (Ritual of Durga Puja)
 Mohalaya: Mohalaya which is celebrated in all over Mithila on Aashin Maash Amavasya tithi, sculptors, who have been working for days carving and chiseling the statue of Durga, carry out their final touch of drawing the eyes of Durga Maay in Begusarai and other Mithila Districts.
Durga Puja: a ten-day festival, of which the last five are of the most significance. is an important festival in the Shaktism tradition of Hinduism. It marks the victory of goddess Durga in her battle against the shape-shifting asura, Mahishasura. Thus, the festival epitomizes the victory of good over evil, though it is also in part a harvest festival celebrating the goddess as the motherly power behind all of life and creation.
 Kali Puja: dedicated to the Hindu goddess Kali, celebrated on the new moon day Dipannita Amavasya of the Hindu month Kartik
 Saraswati Puja: marks the preparation for the arrival of spring. The festival is celebrated by people of Dharmic religions in the South Asian countries in different ways depending on the region. Vasant Panchami also marks the start of preparation for Holika and Holi, which take place forty days later. 
 Aakhar Bochhor(Maithili New year): Maithili New year celebrated on 15 April every year.
 Rama Navami: celebrates the descent of Vishnu as the Rama avatar, through his birth to King Dasharatha and Queen Kausalya in Ayodhya, Kosala. 
 Basanti Puja (Chaiti Durga Puja)
 Til Sakraait (Makar Sankranti)
 Naag Panchami
 Barsaait
 Vishwakarma Puja
 Holi

Notable people 

Ramdhari Singh Dinkar, poet, freedom fighter, essayist.
Ram Sharan Sharma, historian
Balmiki Prasad Singh, writer, former IAS officer, former Governor of Sikkim
Sriti Jha, actress
Kranti Prakash Jha, actor, model
Bhola Singh, politician
Kanhaiya Kumar, politician

See also
 Mithila (proposed Indian state)
 Simaria
 Begusarai (TV series)

Notes

References

Works cited

External links 

 District website of Begusarai

 
Cities and towns in Begusarai district
Caravanserais in India